This is the complete discography of musician Roine Stolt.

Studio albums

With Kaipa
 Kaipa (1975)
 Inget Nytt Under Solen (1976)
 Solo (1978)
 Notes from the Past (2002)
 Keyholder (2003)
 Mindrevolutions (2005)

Solo albums
 Fantasia (1979)
 Behind the Walls (1985)
 The Lonely Heartbeat (1989)
 The Flower King (1994)
 Hydrophonia (1998)
 Wallstreet Voodoo (2005)
 Manifesto of an Alchemist (2018) (as Roine Stolt's the Flower King)

With The Flower Kings
 Back in the World of Adventures (1995)
 Retropolis (1996)
 Stardust We Are (1997)
 Scanning the Greenhouse (1998)
 Flower Power (1999)
 Alive on Planet Earth (2000)
 Space Revolver (2000)
 The Rainmaker (2001)
 Unfold the Future (2002)
 Meet the Flower Kings (2003)
 Adam & Eve (2004)
 Paradox Hotel (2006)
 Instant Delivery (2006)
 The Sum Of No Evil (2007)
 The Road Back Home (2007)
 Tour Kaputt (2011)
 Banks of Eden (2012)
 Desolation Rose (2013)
 Waiting For Miracles (2019)
 Islands (2020)
 By Royal Decree (2022)

With Transatlantic
 SMPT:e (2000)
 Bridge Across Forever (2001)
 Live in America (2001)
 SMPTe: The Roine Stolt Mixes (2003)
 Live in Europe (2003)
 The Transatlantic Demos (2003)
 The Whirlwind (2009)
 Whirld Tour 2010: Live in London (2010)
 More Never Is Enough: Live In Manchester & Tilburg 2010 (2010)
 Kaleidoscope (2014)
 KaLIVEoscope (2014)
 The Absolute Universe (2021)

With Kaipa da Capo
 Dårskapens monotoni (2016)

With Bollenberg Experience
 Bollenberg Experience - If Only Stones Could Speak (2002)

With The Tangent
 The Music That Died Alone (2003)
 The World That We Drive Through (2004)
 Pyramids and Stars (2005)

With Karmakanic
 Entering The Spectra (2002)
 Wheel Of Life (2004)
 Who's The Boss In The Factory (2008)

With Circus Brimstone
 BrimStoned In Europe (2005)

With Agents of Mercy
 The Fading Ghosts of Twilight (2009)
 Dramarama (2010)
 The Black Forest (2011)

With 3rd World Electric
 Kilimanjaro Secret Brew (2009)

With Jon Anderson 
 Invention of Knowledge (2016)

With The Sea Within
 The Sea Within (2018)

With Supernal End Game
 Touch the Sky - Volume I (2010)
 Touch the Sky - Volume II (2014)

Other albums

With The Flower Kings
 Édition Limitée Québec (1998)
 Fan Club 2000 (2000)
 Live In New York - Official Bootleg (2002)
 Fan Club 2002 (2002)
 BetchaWannaDanceStoopid!!! (2004)
 Fan Club 2004 (2004)
 Fan Club 2005 / Harvest (2005)
 Carpe Diem - Live In USA 2006 (2008)

Selected guest appearances
 Neal Morse - ? (2005)
 Steve Hackett - Genesis Revisited II (2012)
 The Prog World Orchestra - A Proggy Christmas (2012)
 Charlie Faege & Tricky Dogs - Long Away and Far Ago (2016) Charlie Faege & Tricky Dogs
 The Prog Collective - Songs We Were Taught (2022) Bandcamp

Stolt, Roine
Stolt, Roine